Sason (formerly known as Sasun or Sassoun), is a town in the Batman Province of Turkey. It is the seat of the Sason District. Its population is 12,696 (2021). 

Sasun, as it is called by Armenians, plays a prominent role in Armenian culture and history. It is the setting of Daredevils of Sassoun, Armenia's national epic. In the late 19th and early 20th centuries, it was a major center of the activities of the Armenian fedayi, who staged two uprisings against the Ottoman authorities and Kurdish tribes in 1894 and 1904. In the local elections of March 2019, Muzaffer Arslan was elected Mayor. He was replaced by Mehmet Şafi Yavuz in February 2021.

History
Historically, the area was known as Sasun, part of the historical Armenian Highlands. The exact etymology of the name is unknown, although various folk etymologies exist. Sasun is mentioned (in the form Sanasunkʻ) as one of the cantons of the Aghdznik' province of the ancient Kingdom of Armenia in the geography of 7th-century Armenian scholar Anania Shirakatsi. Later, the region was ruled by the Mamikonian dynasty from around 772 until 1189/1190, when the Mamikonians moved to Cilicia after being dispossessed by the Shah-Armens.

Ottoman period
The region was eventually conquered by the Ottoman Empire, becoming part of the sanjak of Muş in Bitlis Vilayet, and continued to hold a substantial population of Armenians. During this period, Sason was a federation of some forty Armenian villages, whose inhabitants were known as Sasuntsis. Surrounded by fierce Kurdish tribes to whom they were often forced to pay tribute, the Sasuntsis were able to maintain an autonomy free of Turkish rule until the end of the 19th century when the Kurds themselves were finally brought under government control. Proud warriors, the Sasuntsis made all their weapons and relied on nothing from the outside world.

In 1893, some three to four thousand nomadic Kurds from the Diyarbakır plains entered Sason region. This incursion of nomads, who customarily used the mountain meadows of the area in summer for their herds, was harmful to the sedentary Armenians. Some Kurdish tribes were responsible for bringing economic ruin to the agrarian community of the Armenian villagers: they would steal livestock and demand that the Armenians should pay a second tax (that is, a separate tax in addition to the one Armenians paid to the Ottoman government). When the Armenians decided to challenge extortion, a fight ensued and a Kurd was killed. Using the Kurd's death as a pretext by describing that a revolt had taken place, Turkish officials endorsed a Kurdish revenge attack against the Armenians of Sason.

The Kurds, however, were successfully driven off by the armed Armenian villagers, but that success was then seen as a possible threat by the Ottoman authorities. In 1894, the villagers refused to pay taxes unless the Ottoman authorities adequately protected them against renewed Kurdish raids as well as extortion. Instead, the government sent a force of about 3,000 soldiers and Kurdish irregulars to disarm the villagers, an event which ended in a general massacre of between 900 and 3,000 men, women and children. The "Sasun affair" was widely publicised and was investigated by representatives from the European Powers, resulting in demands that Ottoman Turkey initiate reforms in the six "Armenian vilayets". Abdul Hamid II's response to those demands culminated in the anti-Armenian pogroms of 1895 and 1896.

As a region where the Hamidian massacres were perpetrated, McDowall estimates that at least 1,000 Armenian villagers were slain in the Sason atrocity, all of which was instigated by the buildup of Ottoman troops in early 1894. Officials and military officers involved in the Sason massacres were decorated and rewarded. More than 60,000 Armenians from the region of Sason died during the Armenian genocide. Many of the survivors fled to Eastern Armenia and settled in villages in the former Ashtarak and Talin districts of Soviet Armenia.

Modern Sason
Today, most of Sason's population is Kurdish and Arab. An Armenian minority may still live in Sason (according to an estimate which was made in 1972, about 6,000 Armenian villagers were still living in the region).
The area is very mountainous, suitable for trekking and climbing, and many white water rivers are also located in it. Mereto mountain has the highest peak in Sason. The area is known for its walnuts. In fact, some locals still use the old name Kâbilcevz. There are numerous ruins in the area, and also some historical water fountains, "Sevek Çeşmesi", "Nabuhan Çeşmesi", "Hapyenk Çeşmesi", and "Ağde Çeşmesi". Also Şehan named turbe, a burial site of a holy man, is the site of celebrations in every July.

Culture
The area was the setting for the Armenian epic Sasna Tsrer (Daredevils of Sassoun), which was rediscovered and first partly written down in 1873. It is better known as Sasuntsi Davit ("David of Sasun").  This epic dates from the time of the invasion of Armenia by the Caliphs of Egypt (about 670), in which the Armenian folk hero of the same name drives foreign invaders from Armenia.

See also
Sasun Resistance (1894)
Sasun Uprising (1904)

References

External links
 Armenian History and Presence in Sason
https://westernarmeniatv.com/tr/12074/sason-ermenileri-roportaji

Populated places in Sason District
Towns in Turkey
Kurdish settlements in Batman Province